Central Government Employees Welfare Housing Organisation is an autonomous organisation of the Indian Government established in 1995. The organisation was established to construct and manage non-profit housing for serving and retired employees of the Union Government of India and their families. Since 1995 the organisation has constructed two houses every day.

References

1995 establishments in Delhi
Government agencies of India
Government agencies established in 1995